Anjangaon Bari is a village in Amravati district, Maharashtra, India.

Demographics

Per the 2011 Census of India, Anjangaon Bari has a total population of 7257; of those 3711 are male and 3546 are female.

References

Villages in Amravati district